Remixes is a 1997 French remix studio album by Neneh Cherry (appearing as Neneh Chérie). It is also known as The French Remixes.

Track listing 
 "Kootchi" (Air Remix)
 "Beastiality" (Christophe Monier Remix)
 "Carry Me" (Emmanuel Top Remix)
 "Everything" (Sulee B Wax Remix)
 "Feel It" (Sub-Vision Remix)
 "Feel It" (Doctor L. Remix)
 "Woman" (La Funk Mob Remix)

1997 remix albums
Neneh Cherry albums
albums produced by Cameron McVey
albums produced by David M. Allen
House music remix albums